Jean-Pierre Lacroix (1938–1989) was a French entomologist.

Book 
The Beetles of the World, Odontolabini 1 (Lucanidae)

Works 
The complete list of his publications was written by Hugues E. Bomans.

Some of his last works include:
 1982 - Notes sur quelques Coleoptera Lucanidae nouveaux ou peu connus, Miscellanea Entomologica, 49, pp. 13–30.
 1983 - Descriptions de Coleoptera Lucanidae nouveaux ou peu connus (2ème note) (in collaboration with P. Ratti and G. Taroni), Bulletin de la Société Sciences Nat, 38, pp. 2–8.
 1983 - Descriptions de Coleoptera Lucanidae nouveaux ou peu connus (3ème note), Bulletin de la Société Sciences Nat, 40, pp. 5–19.
 1987 - Descriptions de Coleoptera Lucanidae nouveaux ou peu connus (4ème note), Bulletin de la Société Sciences Nat, 56, pp. 11–13, 1 col. plate.
 1988 - Descriptions de Coleoptera Lucanidae nouveaux ou peu connus (5ème note), Bulletin de la Société Sciences Nat, 57, pp. 7–12.
 1989 - Descriptions de Coleoptera Lucanidae nouveaux ou peu connus (6ème note), Bulletin de la Société Sciences Nat, 59, pp. 5–7, 1 col. plate.
 1990 - Descriptions de Coleoptera Lucanidae nouveaux ou peu connus (7ème note), Bulletin de la Société Sciences Nat, 65, pp. 11–14, 1 col. plate.
 1991 - Descriptions de Coleoptera Lucanidae nouveaux ou peu connus (8ème note), Bulletin de la Société Sciences Nat, 69, pp. 25–26.

Entomological terms named after him  
 Aegus platypodon lacroixi Bomans, 1993
 Cyclommatus lacroixi Weinreich, 1971
 Ditomoderus lacroixi Bomans, 1973
 Homoderinus lacroixi Bomans, 1969
 Lissotes lacroixi Bomans, 1986
 Prosopocoilus lacroixi Bomans, 1970

List of the taxa he created 
The list of 95 new names which he  created is published on the web.

Among them are several new species of Cyclommatus which were never the object of a publication. In fact the author prepared a revision of the genus to appear in a volume of the series of The Beetles of the World, almost totality of photos had been realized by Guy Bouloux. A heart attack at the age of 51 ended this project.

Another work in preparation was a fauna of the Stag beetles of the island of Sumatra, thanks to the numerous sendings of specimens captured on the spot by Dr Eduard W . Diehl.

References

French entomologists
Coleopterists
1938 births
1989 deaths
20th-century French zoologists